The Ladykirk and Norham Bridge connects Ladykirk in the Borders, Scotland, with Norham in Northumberland, England, across the River Tweed. It's one of three bridges that cross it along the Anglo-Scottish Border, the others being the Coldstream Bridge and the Union Chain Bridge; out of these, the Ladykirk and Norham Bridge is the youngest, opening to the public in 1888.

Earlier bridges
The previous bridge was a timber trestle built between 1838 and 1839 by J. Blackmore. The bridge was funded by subscribers purchasing shares; David Robertson, 1st Baron Marjoribanks paid L.3000, and ten others paid L.500 each.

These were used to create two arches, each of  span and  rise, each arch was supported by two trusses. The entire bridge was restored in 1852, with the exception of the stone piers.

History
Construction of the present stone bridge lasted from 1885 to 1887. The bridge is listed at grade II by English Heritage and at category B by Historic Scotland.

It was designed by Thomas Codrington and Cuthbert A. Brereton for the Tweed Bridges Trust.

Design
It is a late stone road arch bridge with four spans. The outer piers have triangular cutwaters, but the central pier has a curved cutwater that continues up to the height of the road, with a break in the parapet to create a refuge for pedestrians.

The bridge uses dressed-stone for the arch rings, and has coursed-rubble spandrels and wing walls. It is built from red sandstone, and faced with ashlar dressings. The spandrels are hollow to reduce the load on the arches, an innovation by Thomas Telford.

The bridge carries the B6470 public road between the villages of Ladykirk in Scotland and Norham in England. It is just downstream from Canny Island, a river island in the Tweed.

References

Bridges across the River Tweed
Grade II listed bridges
Grade II listed buildings in Northumberland
Category B listed buildings in the Scottish Borders
Listed bridges in Scotland
Bridges in the Scottish Borders
Bridges completed in 1887
Anglo-Scottish border
1887 establishments in Scotland
Norham